Paco de Onis is an American documentary film producer.  His film, State of Fear: The Truth about Terrorism, won the 2006 Overseas Press Club Award for "Best Reporting in Any Medium on Latin America".

External links
 
 Video (with mp3 available) of conversation with Paco de onis on Bloggingheads.tv

References

Living people
Year of birth missing (living people)
Place of birth missing (living people)